Cataumet station is a former railroad station located on Post Office Square in Cataumet, Massachusetts.

History

The original station opened in 1890, eighteen years after the Woods Hole Branch of the Old Colony Railroad was created.  The gingerbread structure was destroyed by a fire in 1925 and subsequently replaced by a small brick structure which still stands today.  It was last used as a railroad station in 1988 by the Cape Cod & Hyannis Railroad.

References

External links
 

1890 establishments in Massachusetts
Bourne, Massachusetts
Former railway stations in Massachusetts
Old Colony Railroad Stations on Cape Cod
Railway stations in the United States opened in 1890
Stations along Old Colony Railroad lines